Slivno is a municipality of Dubrovnik-Neretva County in south Croatia. It has a population of 1,999 (census 2011), in which absolute majority are Croats (93.7%). The municipality includes the following settlements:
 Blace
 Duba
 Duboka
 Klek
 Komarna
 Kremena
 Lovorje
 Lučina
 Mihalj
 Otok
 Pižinovac
 Podgradina
 Raba
 Slivno Ravno
 Trn
 Tuštevac
 Vlaka
 Zavala

References

Municipalities of Croatia
Populated places in Dubrovnik-Neretva County